The tomahawk chop is a sports celebration most popularly used by fans of the American Florida State Seminoles, Atlanta Braves baseball team, the Kansas City Chiefs American football team, and the English Exeter Chiefs rugby union team. The chop has been the source of controversy for decades and has been characterized as a racist caricature of Native American culture. The "chop" has also been performed at the high school level, where hundreds of teams continue to use Native American names and imagery, which has been a factor in the movement to change these practices. The tomahawk chop involves moving the forearm forwards and backwards repeatedly with an open palm to simulate a tomahawk chopping, and is often accompanied by a distinctive cheer. The Atlanta Braves also developed a foam tomahawk to complement the fan actions.

Florida State University 

It is not known when the tomahawk chop was invented. However, it is claimed by a former Florida State University president that it was invented by the Florida State University Marching Chiefs in the 1980s to complement their war chants. The action was adopted by fans of the FSU Seminoles over the following years. Despite this, the university's board does not endorse the action stating "Some traditions we cannot control... It's a term we did not choose and officially do not use".

Kansas City Chiefs 

The Chiefs first heard it in November 1990, when the Northwest Missouri State band, directed by 1969 Florida State graduate Al Sergel, did the chant.

"It is a direct descendant of Florida State," said Chiefs promotions director Phil Thomas. "The band started doing the tomahawk chop, and the players and (coach) Marty Schottenheimer loved it."

The tomahawk chop has evolved into a pregame tradition at home games. Chiefs cheerleaders had long used their hands to bang on a large drum to the beat of the tomahawk chop, sometimes replaced by a former player or local celebrity using a large drum stick, all while the crowd performs the chop action. Since 2020, however, Kansas City Chiefs cheerleaders have been required to lead the chop with a closed fist rather than the traditional open palm.

Atlanta Braves 

The tomahawk chop was adopted by fans of the Atlanta Braves in 1991. While some have credited Deion Sanders for bringing the chop to Atlanta, it was Braves organist Carolyn King who started playing the "tomahawk song." King started playing the "tomahawk song" before at bats for a few seasons, but it caught on with Braves fans when the team started winning in 1991.

The usage of foam tomahawks led to criticism from Native American groups that it was "demeaning" to them and called for them to be banned. In response, the Braves' public relations director said that it was "a proud expression of unification and family". King, who did not understand the political ramifications, approached one of the Native American chiefs who were protesting. The chief told her that leaving her job as an organist would not change anything and that if she left "they'll find someone else to play."

In 2016, when the Atlanta Braves played their last game at Turner Field before leaving for SunTrust Park, the last official act done at Turner Field was known as "The Final Chop", where the Atlanta Braves warchant was played one last time with fans doing the tomahawk chop.

Foam tomahawk

A foam tomahawk is a foam rubber sports paraphernalia item (like a foam №. 1 finger) in the shape of a tomahawk, often used to accompany the tomahawk chop. They were first created in 1991 for the Atlanta Braves baseball team following their adoption of the tomahawk chop.

Creation 
Foam tomahawks were invented by foam salesman Paul Braddy. Upon hearing Skip Caray saying during a radio broadcast of an Atlanta Braves game that they needed tomahawks to accompany their newly acquired tomahawk chop celebration, he approached the Braves' concessions manager John Eifert with a suggestion of a foam rubber tomahawk. Eifert agreed providing they cost around $5, to which Braddy carved a tomahawk out of foam with an electric knife.  Eifert bought 5,000 for sale for the Atlanta Braves. The foam tomahawks became very popular with Braves fans at the Atlanta–Fulton County Stadium, so much so that Braddy was able to quit his $60,000-a-year job as a salesman in order to manufacture foam tomahawks full-time, making 8,000 a day.

Braddy started selling the foam tomahawks himself. However, he was approached by Major League Baseball a month into the venture, who claimed that the foam tomahawk infringed upon the Atlanta Braves' copyrighted tomahawk logo. In response, Braddy made a deal with Major League Baseball Properties to license the MLB symbol and receive logistical support in exchange for 10% of the profits.

Controversy 
The usage of foam tomahawks led to criticism from Native American groups that it was "demeaning" to them and called for them to be banned. In response, the Braves' public relations director said that it was "a proud expression of unification and family". In preparation as a response to any potential ban, Braddy prepared to discuss deals with the Florida State University Seminoles, Kansas City Chiefs and Washington Redskins American football teams, as well as other universities with Native American mascots.

Exeter Chiefs 
The English rugby team Exeter Chiefs adopted the name of "Chiefs" in 1999. In 2010 they started using the Tomahawk chop along with the war chant, following their promotion to the English Premiership. They use it as their walk out music at Sandy Park as well as a chant by their traveling fans during rugby matches elsewhere in the UK.
In June 2020 a petition was launched by a group of Exeter Chiefs supporters calling for an end to the club's use of Native American imagery, including the Tomahawk chop. In August 2020, it was reported that BT Sport would not be including the "tomahawk chop chant" in its simulated crowd noises, during behind-closed-doors games played by the Exeter Chiefs and broadcast on the BT Sport platform.

In 2022 Exeter Chiefs rebranded with a Celtic Iron Age Dumnonii Tribe club crest, dropping the controversial Native American crest. They also announced they would no longer play the Tomahawk Chop as their run out anthem from the 2022–23 season. However, in January 2023 the chant was sung by supporters and, according to reports on social media, played over stadium speakers.

Controversy 

The chop has been characterized by some, including Native American tribes, as mocking Native American culture. It is criticized for being a reference to the former practice of scalping. Shortly after the Atlanta Braves adopted it, there were a number of calls from Native Americans for Braves fans to stop doing the tomahawk chop. Prior to the 1991 World Series a number of Native Americans protested against the Braves using the tomahawk chop outside the Metrodome. During the protests Clyde Bellecourt, national director of the American Indian Movement, suggested that the team could be called "the Atlanta Negroes, Atlanta Klansmen or Atlanta Nazis". In 2009, the Gill-Montague Regional School Committee, a local school board in Massachusetts, banned the use of the gesture at school sporting events, calling it offensive and discriminatory. In 2016, Native American groups asked the Kansas City Chiefs to stop doing the tomahawk chop. In the same year a similar request was made of Exeter Chiefs. The editorial board of The Kansas City Star newspaper called for the cessation of the so-called "Arrowhead Chop" in late 2019, noting opposition from Native Americans and Tribes, and stating that the practice stereotypes and dehumanizes Native Americans.

In politics, during the 2012 Senate election in Massachusetts, staffers of candidate Scott Brown were filmed doing the tomahawk chop at a campaign rally towards supporters of Elizabeth Warren, to mock Warren's claim of having Native American ancestry.

The controversy has persisted since and became national news again during the 2019 National League Division Series. During the series, St. Louis Cardinals relief pitcher and Cherokee Nation member Ryan Helsley was asked about the chop and chant. Helsley said he found the fans' chanting and arm-motions insulting and that the chop depicts natives “in this kind of caveman-type people way who aren’t intellectual.” Helsley's comments prompted the Braves to stop handing out foam tomahawks, playing the chop music, or showing the chop graphic when the series returned to Atlanta for Game 5. The Braves released a statement saying they would "continue to evaluate how we activate elements of our brand, as well as the overall in-game experience" and that they would continue a "dialogue with those in the Native American community after the postseason concludes."

During the off-season, the Braves met with the National Congress of American Indians to start discussing a path forward. In July 2020, the team faced mounting pressure to change after the Cleveland Indians and Washington Redskins announced they were discussing brand changes. The Braves released a statement announcing that discussions were still ongoing about the chop, but that the team name would not be changed.

In popular culture 

Mel Brooks' 1993 film Robin Hood: Men in Tights features a medieval crowd performing the chop in support of Robin Hood during an archery contest.

References 

Sports culture in the United States
Atlanta Braves
Florida State University
Exeter Chiefs
Kansas City Chiefs
Native American people
Baseball culture
American football culture
College sports culture in the United States
Major League Baseball controversies
Native American-related controversies